Pavel Chihuán Camayo (born 19 January 1986) is a male Peruvian racewalker. He competed in the 20 kilometres walk event at the 2015 World Championships in Athletics in Beijing, China.

See also
 Peru at the 2015 World Championships in Athletics

References

External links
 

Living people
Place of birth missing (living people)
1986 births
Peruvian male racewalkers
World Athletics Championships athletes for Peru
Athletes (track and field) at the 2016 Summer Olympics
Olympic athletes of Peru